Peter Lofland House is a historic home located at Milford, Kent County, Delaware.  It was built about 1880, and is a two-story, five bay, "L"-shaped center hall brick dwelling with a mansard roof. It has a two-story rear wing.  It features a three bay with decorative brackets and a projecting bay.

It was listed on the National Register of Historic Places in 1982.

References

Houses on the National Register of Historic Places in Delaware
Houses completed in 1880
Houses in Milford, Delaware
Houses in Kent County, Delaware
National Register of Historic Places in Kent County, Delaware